"Don't You Miss Me" is a single by Bosnian band Sikter from the album My Music, written and produced by Enes Zlatar and Dragan Rokvić. It was released as a single on May 27, 2005, by Gramofon as only single from the album. 

Except original version there are three remixes of the song, remixed and produced by Bosnian artists: Edward EQ, DJ Ahmaad, Basheskia and Branski.

Track listing

Music video
The video for the song features Ibrahim Spahić and his son Mirsad. Video is about relationship between father and son and the generation gap. Father try to connect with his son but it's not simple as he thinks. It was directed by Timur Makarević and produced by pro.ba. Video was recorded on Igman mountain. Video premiere was on May 19, 2005 on Bosnian national television BHT1.

References

External links
Gramofon.ba
Don't You Miss Me - Gramofon

2005 singles
Sikter songs
2005 songs